Hazur Maharaj Charan Singh Ji (1916–1990), was the spiritual head of Radha Soami Satsang Beas, Dera Baba Jaimal Singh, after he was named successor by the preceding Beas guru Sardar Bahadur Maharaj Jagat Singh Ji, in 1951. Maharaj Charan Singh served as the guru for the Beas Dera for almost four decades, until his death from heart failure in 1990 at the age of 73. Before his appointment in 1951, he had practiced law in Hisar and Sirsa, India. He was an initiate of Maharaj Sawan Singh's, who was his paternal grandfather and the predecessor of Maharaj Jagat Singh. Maharaj Charan Singh assigned the duties of his successor and Guru to his initiate and nephew Baba Gurinder Singh.

Early life and education 
Maharaj Charan Singh was born in 1916 in his mother’s home at the Moga, which is now a district of Punjab. His Birth name was Harcharan Singh but was later changed to the Charan Singh. His father, Sardar Harbans Singh Grewal, was the youngest son of Maharaj Sawan Singh Ji, who was affectionately known as the Great Master. His mother name was Mata Sham Kaur.

At the age of 22, Maharaj Charan Singh completed his B.A. degree from Gordon College, Rawalpindi, and went on to study law at Punjab University, Lahore. After receiving his LL.B. degree in 1942, he started to build his own practice as a lawyer in the town of Sirsa, near the family home. In 1943 Maharaj Sawan Singh arranged his marriage to Harjeet Kaur, the daughter of Rao Bahadur Shiv Dhyan Singh.

Spiritual path 
By the time Maharaj Ji was appointed as the Satguru, the Dera had grown, and many satsang centres had been established throughout India. His practical understanding of administrative matters allowed him to make changes to the administrative structure that would carry the organization smoothly into a fast-changing, modern world. In 1957, Maharaj Ji placed all Dera assets into a Charitable Trust, the Radha Soami Satsang Beas Society. Maharaj Ji himself helped frame the constitution and rules and regulations for the Society. His leadership in this matter created an administrative framework under which the Dera and its activities continue to be administered.

As the spiritual head of Radha Soami Satsang Beas, Maharaj Charan Singh was noted for his succinct and clear explanations of the Sant Mat teachings, a reflection of his legal training and practice. He had many disciples from foreign countries as well as India, and would often give discourses and hold question-and-answer sessions with them, both at the Beas International guest house, as well as on his frequent overseas tours. Many of these sessions were published in books and as audio recordings, and offer a comprehensive understanding of the path of Sant Mat. Under his guidance, books on Sant Mat were published in almost every Indian language, as well as the main languages spoken globally such as French, Spanish, Dutch, German, Greek, Italian, Indonesian, and many others.

Most of the activities of the Society take place in the form of seva – voluntary service to the Lord through service to humanity – which is a key foundation of the teachings of the Beas masters. Maharaj Charan Singh initiated the launching of a Medical Eye Camp, a network of charitable hospitals, disaster management projects, and free food distribution programmes, which have continued as his legacy.

Death and successor 
On June 1st, 1990, Maharaj Charan Singh passed away at Dera, Beas. He entrusted his authority and responsibility as Patron of the Radha Soami Satsang Beas Society and the Maharaj Jagat Singh Medical Relief Society Beas to Baba Gurinder Singh Dhillon who, at 36 years of age, has taken on the same responsibilities that had been assumed by Maharaj Charan Singh forty years earlier.

Teachings 
Maharaj Charan Singh's teachings were similar to his predecessors. Some excerpts from his teachings:
Santmat is the path of devotion, in it there is only the glory of love.
 
As much as we have desires, so much our sorrows.
 
No one's desires have been fulfilled hundred percent till today, nor can they be fulfilled.

The love of SatGuru is the love of God.

SatGuru-Bhagti is the door to salvation.

Books
He wrote following books. 
 Die to Live (English) 
 Divine Light (English) 
 Light on Sant Mat (English) 
 Light on Saint John (English) 
 Light on Saint Matthew (English) 
 The Path (English) 
 Quest for Light (English) 
 Spiritual Heritage (English) 
 Spiritual Discourses (English) (two volumes) 
 Spiritual Perspectives (English) (three Volumes)
 Santon Ki Bani

Ancestors 
 Sardar Harbans Singh Grewal (Father)
 Baba Sawan Singh Ji (Grandfather)
 Sardar Kabal Singh Grewal  (Great grandfather)
 Sardar Sher Singh Grewal (Great great grandfather)

References

External links
 Radha Soami Satsang Beas (RSSB)
 Science of the Soul

1916 births
1990 deaths
Surat Shabd Yoga
 Sant Mat gurus